The 2007–08 Scottish Premier League season was the tenth season of the Scottish Premier League. It began on 4 August 2007 and was originally due to end on 18 May 2008. Due to the death of Phil O'Donnell and extremely poor weather causing the postponement of fixtures during the winter, as well as a backlog of Rangers fixtures and their progression to the UEFA Cup Final, the SPL decided to move the final round of fixtures back four days to 22 May 2008. It was the first season under the sponsorship of the Clydesdale Bank.

Gretna were promoted from the First Division the previous season and played in the SPL for the first time, replacing Dunfermline Athletic. Gretna did not play at their home stadium Raydale Park as it did not meet the SPL stadia criteria of 6,000 and instead used Motherwell's Fir Park for all but one of their games; that match was at Livingston's Almondvale Stadium.

Champions Celtic qualified directly for the Champions League, while second-placed Rangers qualified for the Second qualifying round. Third-placed Motherwell qualified for the UEFA Cup and Hibernian qualified for the Intertoto Cup. First Division side Queen of the South also qualified for the UEFA Cup after reaching the Scottish Cup Final. Gretna were relegated after just one season in the SPL and were replaced by First Division champions Hamilton Academical for the following season.

The championship was determined on the final day of the season with Celtic and Rangers even on 86 points. Celtic travelled to Tannadice to play Dundee United knowing that a win would likely secure the title due to their superior goal difference (+57 to +53). Meanwhile, Rangers needed to better Celtic's result in their match against Aberdeen at Pittodrie (a Ranger win and Celtic draw or a Ranger draw coupled with a Celtic loss). If both teams won or lost, then Rangers must better better Celtic's goal difference by 4 or more. As it turned out, Celtic won 1–0 following Jan Vennegoor of Hesselink's second-half header, while Aberdeen F.C. beat Rangers 2–0 thanks to goals from Lee Miller and Steve Lovell.

Clubs

Promotion and Relegation from 2006–07
Promoted from First Division to Premier League
 Gretna

Relegated from Premier League to First Division
 Dunfermline Athletic

Stadia and locations

Personnel and kits

Managerial changes

Notable events

29 December: Thirty-five-year-old Motherwell captain Phil O'Donnell collapsed on the pitch at Fir Park during a match against Dundee United, and died later that evening.
29 March: Gretna were relegated after losing 2–0 to St Mirren at Love Street.
19 April: Hamilton Academical won promotion to the Scottish Premier League as First Division champions following a 2–0 over Clyde.
22 May: Celtic won their third successive SPL title after defeating Dundee United 1–0.
29 May: Gretna were demoted to the Third Division after administrator David Elliot could not guarantee the Football League that the club would fulfil its fixtures next season.
2 June: Gretna resigned from the Scottish Football League because the administrator concluded that the club could not continue to run as a business.

League table

Results

Matches 1–22
During matches 1–22 each team played every other team twice (home and away).

Matches 23–33
During matches 23–33 each team played every other team once (either at home or away).

Matches 34–38
During matches 34–38 each team played every other team in their half of the table once.

Top six

Bottom six

Goals

Top scorers

Hat-tricks

Kits and shirt sponsors

For the first time in the SPL, certain teams also carried secondary sponsors on the back of their jerseys, above the players' names.

Attendances

As of 22 May 2008

1 Gretna were sharing Motherwell's stadium whilst Raydale Park was being upgraded. However, in March the Fir Park pitch was considered unplayable so the game between Gretna and Celtic was played instead at Almondvale, the home of First Division club Livingston.

Managerial changes

Awards

Clydesdale Bank Premier League Monthly awards

Clydesdale Bank Premier League Awards

Broadcasting rights
Setanta Sports provided domestic TV live coverage and highlights as in previous seasons, with STV and BBC Scotland also broadcasting free-to-air highlights. BBC Radio Scotland continued to provide domestic radio coverage, with many games also available internationally, and all domestically, through their website. The BBC held rights to show highlights online and do so through the BBC Sport website. Internationally, the Premier League's overseas television broadcasting partner was TWI, with coverage of the SPL available in over 100 territories worldwide.Overseas Broadcasting | Scottish Premier League | Broadcasting | Overseas

Transfer deals

External links
Scottish Premier League 2007–08 on BBC Sport: News  - Recent results  - Upcoming fixtures  - Live Scores  - Current standings 
Official Premier League site
Scottish Premier League Kits

References

Scottish Premier League seasons
1
Scot